Madhavi is a 2009 Indian Tamil-language soap opera starring Sara, Seenu, Bhavana, Nalini, Subhalekha Sudhakar and Vandhana and Vanitha Krishnachandran that aired on Sun TV for 487 episodes

It was produced by Home Media and writer, screenplay and directed by V. Thiruselvam. It also aired in Sri Lanka Tamil Channel on Vasantham TV.

Plot
The story of a young woman who is good in singing and wants to become a singer. She awaits an opportunity, saying that she is struggling as a chorus singer in the film industry due to her financial situation. Her dream is to see (Seenu) Manohar (her fiancé) pass the civil service examination to get out of all her financial troubles. Manohar is also jobless and penniless during his preparation for the exams and he completely depends on (Sara) Madhavi's money for his family's sustenance.

After a long struggle and preparations, Manohar succeeds in his dream clearing the civil service examination finally. After this, Madhavi ends up facing only with the trouble. When Manohar leaves for his training in different location, Manohar's family flung into crisis. His uncle, an opportunist tries to utilize this situation and decides to marry his daughter to Manohar. Thereby abducting Madhavi and intending to kill her.

Cast

 Sara as Madhavi
 Seenu as Manohar
 Bhavana

Additional cast

 Nalini as Devaki
 Subhalekha Sudhakar
 K. Natraj as Vazhavanthan 
 Devipriya
 Surekha
 Vandhana
 Sonia 
 Mohan Vaidya
 T.R. Balu
 Puvana
 Ramya
 Vanidha
 T.R Balu
 Vaiyenthi
 Thulashi
 Radha Rani
 Joker Thulasi

Airing history 
The show started airing on Sun TV on 21 December 2009 and it aired on Monday through Friday 10:00PM IST. Later its timing changed, a show named Idhayam replaced this show at 10:00PM and pushed this serial to 6:30PM IST.

Awards and nominations

International broadcast
The series was released on 21 December 2009 on Sun TV, the series also airs on Sun TV HD. The show was also broadcast internationally on Channel's international distribution. It aired in Sri Lanka, [South East Asia, [Middle East, United States, Canada, Europe, Oceania, South Africa and Sub Saharan Africa on Sun TV. The show's episodes were released on YouTube channel Home Movie Makers and Mango TV.
 In Sri Lanka, Tamil Channel on Vasantham TV and aired Monday to Friday at 07.30 PM.

See also
 List of TV shows aired on Sun TV (India)

References

External links
 Official Website 
 Sun TV on YouTube
 Sun TV Network 
 Sun Group 
 Madhavi serial Youtube

Sun TV original programming
Tamil-language romance television series
Tamil-language musical television series
2000s Tamil-language television series
2009 Tamil-language television series debuts
Tamil-language television shows
2011 Tamil-language television series endings